Damla Shoaib Risalat is an Afghan Taliban politician and commander who is currently serving as Governor of Jowzjan province since November 2021.

References

Living people
Year of birth missing (living people)
Taliban governors
Governors of Jowzjan Province